L'Alcúdia de Crespins is a municipality in the comarca of Costera in the Valencian Community, Spain.

References

Alcudia de Crespins, L'
Alcudia de Crespins, L'